The following television stations broadcast on digital channel 34 in Mexico:

 XHABC-TDT in Chihuahua, Chihuahua
 XHAMC-TDT in Ciudad Acuña, Coahuila de Zaragoza
 XHAS-TDT in Tijuana, Baja California
 XHBM-TDT in Mexicali, Baja California
 XHCHN-TDT in Chilpancingo, Guerrero 
 XHCIC-TDT in Cintalapa de Figueroa, Chiapas
 XHCJE-TDT in Ciudad Juárez, Chihuahua
 XHCLV-TDT on Cerro de las Lajas, Veracruz
 XHCNS-TDT in Cananea, Sonora
 XHCPA-TDT in Campeche, Campeche 
 XHCPS-TDT in Cumpas, Sonora 
 XHCTMO-TDT in Morelia, Michoacán
 XHGPD-TDT in Gómez Palacio, Durango
 XHKC-TDT in Fresnillo, Zacatecas
 XHLQR-TDT in Chetumal, Quintana Roo
 XHLSI-TDT in Mazatlán, Sinaloa
 XHMBT-TDT in Ciudad Mante, Tamaulipas
 XHMET-TDT in Tenosique, Tabasco 
 XHMHG-TDT in Ciudad Hidalgo, Michoacán  
 XHMPU-TDT in Puruándiro, Michoacán  
 XHMTC-TDT in Tacámbaro, Michoacán  
 XHMZA-TDT in Zacapu, Michoacán 
 XHMZN-TDT in Mazatan, Sonora
 XHNQR-TDT in Cancún, Quintana Roo
 XHOXO-TDT in Oaxaca, Oaxaca 
 XHPIX-TDT in Santiago Pinotepa Nacional, Oaxaca
 XHPTP-TDT on Pico Tres Padres, México 
 XHQUE-TDT in Querétaro, Querétaro
 XHSAC-TDT in Santa Bárbara, Chihuahua
 XHSBC-TDT in Sabinas-Nueva Rosita, Coahuila
 XHSGE-TDT in Suaqui Grande, Sonora 
 XHSLT-TDT in San Luis Potosí, San Luis Potosí
 XHSPRLA-TDT in León, Guanajuato
 XHSPY-TDT in Tepic, Nayarit
 XHSTA-TDT in Villahermosa, Tabasco
 XHTDJA-TDT in Guadalajara, Jalisco
 XHTGG-TDT in Tecpan de Galeana, Guerrero
 XHTHP-TDT in Tehuacán, Puebla
 XHTWH-TDT in Tulancingo, Hidalgo
 XHTZA-TDT in Zamora, Michoacán  
 XHURU-TDT in Uruapan, Michoacán  
 XHVET-TDT in La Venta, Tabasco 

34